This timeline of the history of piracy in the 1660s is a chronological list of key events involving pirates between 1660 and 1669.

Events

1660
Although divided largely by nationality, with the English in Jamaica and the French in Tortuga or St. Dominique, a large buccaneering presence is established in the various English, French and Dutch colonies in the Lesser Antilles.
The island of Tortuga officially becomes a colony of France due in part to the diplomatic efforts of Jeremie Deschampes.

Births
Thomas Dover, English buccaneer

Deaths
 Gustav Skytte

See also
Timeline of piracy

References

Piracy
Piracy by year